James Donnelly may refer to:

Politicians
 James A. Donnelly, American lawyer, politician, and judge from New York
 James J. Donnelly (1866–1948), Canadian senator
 Jim Donnelly (politician) (born 1967), American politician from Maine

Sportspeople
 James C. Donnelly (1881–1952), American football player and coach
 Boots Donnelly (James F. Donnelly, born 1942), American football coach
 James Donnelly (baseball) (1867–1933), baseball player
 Jim Donnelly (baseball) (1865–1915), Major League Baseball third baseman
 Jimmy Donnelly (bowls) ( 1970s), Irish lawn bowler
 Jim Donnelly (cricketer) (1906–1978), Australian cricketer
 James Donnelly (footballer) (1893–1959), Irish association football player and manager
 Jamesie Donnelly ( 2000s), Irish hurler
 Babe Donnelly (James Joseph Donnelly, 1894–1968), ice hockey player
 James Donnelly (rugby league) (fl. 1989–1991), Brisbane Broncos player
 Jim Donnelly (snooker player) (born 1946), Scottish snooker player
 Jimmy Donnelly (footballer), English footballer

Others
 James Donnelly (American actor) (1865–1937), actor in The Pullman Bride
 James Donnelly (British actor) (1930–1992), British actor in Scum
 James Donnelly (bishop) (1823–1893), Irish Catholic bishop
 James S. Donnelly Jr. (born 1943), British and Irish historian

See also
 Black Donnellys, whose patriarch was James Donnelly (1816–1880), an Irish Catholic immigrant family massacred in Canada, 1880